Jessica Looman is an American attorney and government official who is the nominee to serve as administrator of the Wage and Hour Division.

Education 
Looman earned a Bachelor of Art degree in politics and government from George Washington University and a Juris Doctor from the University of Minnesota Law School.

Career 
From 2001 to 2011, Looman worked as the general counsel for the Laborers District Council of Minnesota and North Dakota. Looman joined the Minnesota Department of Labor and Industry in 2011, serving as assistant commissioner until 2014 and deputy commissioner from 2014 to 2017. From 2017 to 2019, she served as commissioner of the Minnesota Department of Commerce. She worked as the executive director of the Minnesota State Building and Construction Trades Council from 2017 to 2021 and joined the United States Department of Labor in 2021 as the principal deputy administrator of the Wage and Hour Division.

References 

Living people
American labor lawyers
George Washington University alumni
University of Minnesota Law School alumni
United States Department of Labor officials
Minnesota lawyers
Year of birth missing (living people)